Project 1840 is the name of a Soviet diesel-electric submarine design of which only one vessel was built. The design is known in the west by its NATO reporting name Lima. The submarine, which was assigned hull number БС-555 (БС, большая специальная or bolshaya spetsialnaya, meaning large special), was completed in 1979, and used by the Black Sea Fleet. It was decommissioned and laid up in 1994. The exact purpose of this boat has remained unclear to western observers. It is suspected that it had an auxiliary role and was used for trying out new technologies, research, or special mission support. The vessel was assumed to be unarmed.

External links 
Federation of American Scientists: Lima
Russian ships.info

Russian and Soviet navy submarine classes
Auxiliary ships of the Soviet Navy